Mackeys may refer to two unincorporated communities in the United States:

 Mackeys, Missouri
 Mackeys, North Carolina

See also
 Mackey (disambiguation)
 Mackay (disambiguation)
 McKay (disambiguation)
 McKey (disambiguation)